Indiana Boys School

The Heritage Trail Correctional Facility  is a private minimum-security state prison for men located in Plainfield, Hendricks County, Indiana, operated by the GEO Group under contract with the Indiana Department of Correction.

Heritage Trail is operated at minimum security and focuses on inmates transitioning out of the system.  Heritage Trail first opened in 2014 following the closure of the Indiana Boys School. The facility had an average capacity of 827 inmates through 2014.  The facility stands on the site of the former state reformatory, the Indiana House of Refuge, first established in 1867.

References

Prisons in Indiana
Buildings and structures in Hendricks County, Indiana
GEO Group
2014 establishments in Indiana